Customs is a poetry collection by Solmaz Sharif published in 2022.

Writing and development
Sharif has said she feels Customs is more transgressive than her earlier collection, Look.

Reception
The collection received positive reviews from critics. Writing in The New York Times, Jessica Gigot praised the collection, writing that Sharif's "reflections on freedom, consumerism and loyalty are at once witty and incisive".

References

2022 poetry books
Graywolf Press books
American poetry collections